Namik Dokle (born 11 March 1946) is an Albanian politician.  He served as Speaker of the Assembly of the Republic of Albania from 4 September 2001 to 30 April 2002.

Dokle is lecturer in Political Academy of the Socialist Party of Albania.

See also
 Political Academy of the Socialist Party of Albania

References

Speakers of the Parliament of Albania
Members of the Parliament of Albania
Government ministers of Albania
Deputy Prime Ministers of Albania
People from Durrës
1946 births
Living people
Socialist Party of Albania politicians
21st-century Albanian politicians